The 2021–22 Olympique Lyonnais Féminin season was the club's eighteenth season since FC Lyon joined OL as its women's section. Olympique Lyonnais finished the season as Champions of the Division 1 Féminine and UEFA Women's Champions League, whilst they were knocked out of the Coupe de France Féminine by Paris Saint-Germain at the Round of 16 stage.

Season events
On 21 June, Olympique Lyonnais announced the signings of Christiane Endler to a three-year contract, and Daniëlle van de Donk and Signe Bruun to two-year contracts.

On 23 June, Olympique Lyonnais announced the signing of Perle Morroni from Paris Saint-Germain on a contract until 30 June 2024.

On 2 July, Olympique Lyonnais sold Nikita Parris to Arsenal for €80,000, with another €20,000 in addons.

On 13 August, Olympique Lyonnais announced the signing of Emma Holmgren from Eskilstuna United on a contract until 30 June 2023.

On 17 August, Olympique Lyonnais annoucned that Assimina Maoulida had been loaned to Issy until 30 June 2023, Lola Gallardo had left the club to re-join Atlético Madrid and that Katriina Talaslahti had left the club after her contract was terminated by mutual agreement.

On 8 October, Kysha Sylla signed her first professional contract with Olympique Lyonnais until 30 June 2024.

On 12 November, Olympique Lyonnais extended their contract with Grace Kazadi until 30 June 2023.

On 6 December, Olympique Lyonnais extended their contract with Selma Bacha until 30 June 2025.

On 4 January, Sally Julini extended her contract with Olympique Lyonnais until 30 June 2024, and then joined Guingamp on loan for the remainder of the season.

On 31 January, Grace Kazadi joined Sevilla on loan for the remainder of the season.

On 9 May, Wendie Renard extended her contract with Olympique Lyonnais until 30 June 2026.

Squad

Transfers

In

Out

Loans out

Released

Friendlies

International Champions Cup

Competitions

Overview

Division 1

Results summary

Results by matchday

Results

Table

Coupe de France

UEFA Champions League

Qualifying rounds

Group stage

Knockout phase

Final

Squad statistics

Appearances 

|-
|colspan="16"|Players away from the club on loan:

|-
|colspan="16"|Players who appeared for Olympique Lyonnais but left during the season:
|}

Goal scorers

Clean sheets

Disciplinary record

References 

Olympique Lyonnais
Olympique Lyonnais Féminin